The Airports Act 1986 (c. 31) is an Act of the Parliament of the United Kingdom. The act reformed civil aviation in Great Britain and privatised the British Airports Authority from a public department into BAA as a private company. It also granted additional regulatory powers to the Civil Aviation Authority (CAA).

Effect 

The British Airports Authority was established in 1965 by the Airports Authority Act 1965 to take management of the UK's larger airports into public ownership under a government authority. The Airports Act 1986 transferred the powers relating to running government owned airports from the British Airports Authority from the public sector to the private sector as part of a Conservative Party government policy of privatisation. BAA plc. was created as a result of the act to take over the authority's responsibilities. The act also granted statutory authority to the CAA to continue to regulate civil aviation in the United Kingdom as well as BAA. At the time of passage, BAA became responsible for London Heathrow Airport, London Gatwick Airport, London Stansted Airport, Glasgow Prestwick Airport, Glasgow International Airport, Edinburgh Airport and Aberdeen Airport. The act only applied to Great Britain and does not apply to Northern Ireland.

The act also included a number of miscellaneous provisions that were eventually mirrored in airport bylaws. This had the effect of making breaches of airport bylaws punishable under criminal law. An example of this was in 2016 where two people were arrested and charged for being "drunk or under the influence of drugs or other intoxicating substances" in "a restricted area of the airport" contrary to Sections 63 and 63.1 of the Airports Act.

References 

Acts of the Parliament of the United Kingdom concerning Great Britain
Airports in the United Kingdom
Privatisation in the United Kingdom
1986 in British law
Civil aviation in the United Kingdom